WYKO (880 AM) is a radio station broadcasting a Spanish Variety format. It is licensed to Sabana Grande, Puerto Rico, and it serves the Puerto Rico area.  The station is owned by Juan Galiano Rivera.

External links

Sabana Grande, Puerto Rico
1982 establishments in Puerto Rico
Radio stations established in 1982
YKO